Henderson Township is one of twenty-one townships in Knox County, Illinois, USA.  As of the 2010 census, its population was 1,135 and it contained 529 housing units.

Geography

Cities, towns, villages
 Henderson

Unincorporated towns
 Henderson Grove at 
 Soperville at 
(This list is based on USGS data and may include former settlements.)

Cemeteries
The township contains these nine cemeteries: Fuller, Galesburg Research, Gum, Henderson, Henderson Grove, Junk, Oak Lawn Memorial Gardens, Rice-Blue and Soperville.

Demographics

School districts
 Galesburg Community Unit School District 205
 Rowva Community Unit School District 208
 United Community School District 304

Political districts
 Illinois's 17th congressional district
 State House District 74
 State Senate District 37

References
 
 United States Census Bureau 2009 TIGER/Line Shapefiles
 United States National Atlas

External links
 City-Data.com
 Illinois State Archives
 Township Officials of Illinois

Townships in Knox County, Illinois
Galesburg, Illinois micropolitan area
Townships in Illinois